Endurance is a 1998 docudrama film about the famous distance runner Haile Gebrselassie with Gebrselassie playing himself.

It was written and directed by Leslie Woodhead, with Bud Greenspan supervising the competition sequences, and produced and released by Walt Disney Pictures. The movie features Gebrselassie's upbringing in Ethiopia and his subsequent triumph in the 10,000-meter track event in the Atlanta Olympic Games of 1996.

The movie was released on DVD on January 31, 2012.

References

External links 
 
 

American docudrama films
American track and field films
Athletics films
American sports documentary films
Walt Disney Pictures films
Films scored by John Powell
Cultural depictions of Ethiopian people
Cultural depictions of track and field athletes
British docudrama films
1990s English-language films
German docudrama films
German sports films
British sports documentary films
1998 films
1998 documentary films
1990s American films
1990s British films
1990s German films